The South East Asian Junior and Cadet Table Tennis Championships is an annual table tennis tournament regarded as a regional championships between juniors and cadets. It will be held under the management of the South East Asian Table Tennis Association (SEATTA). The winner(s) and runner-up(s) of the Juniors and Cadets will qualify for the Asian Junior and Cadet Table Tennis Championships (AJCTTC).

Editions

Championships

Results of Individual and Team Events

Winners of South East Asian Junior and Cade Championships

Medal Table (2010 - Now)

Some medals of 2011, 2012, and 2016 are unknown

See also
 Asian Junior and Cadet Table Tennis Championships
 Asian Table Tennis Union
 List of table tennis players
 South East Asian Table Tennis Championships
 ITTF World Youth Championships

References

 
Table tennis competitions
Table tennis in Asia
Recurring sporting events established in 1993